Dan Leno (20 December 1860 – 31 October 1904) was an English comedian and stage actor, famous for appearing in music hall, comic plays, pantomimes, Victorian burlesques and musical comedies, during the Victorian and Edwardian eras.  He originated and popularised many songs, sketches and monologues in his music hall acts and made both sound and visual recordings of some of his work shortly before he died. Although brief, Leno's recording period (1901–1903) produced around thirty recordings on one-sided shellac discs using the early acoustic recording process. They were released by the Gramophone and Typewriter Company, one of the early recording companies, which became the parent organisation for the His Master's Voice (HMV) label.

Before Leno's recording debut, music hall comedian Harry Bluff had recorded a number of Leno's songs, which were marketed by the Edison Bell Company in London in 1898.  Leno was initially reluctant to adopt the new medium of sound recording, but he was eventually enticed into the studio with a lucrative commission of one shilling (£4.15 in 2012) per dozen discs sold.  His records sold for five shillings each (£20.75 in 2012) and ran for three minutes. Some of the recorded songs differed from Leno's music hall versions by being condensed to incorporate part of the sketch from which the song was taken.  It is unknown how many discs were sold, because no record was ever kept of their sales.  Despite the success of the recordings and the praise he received from the record distributors, Leno felt uncomfortable in the recording studio.  In an interview for Pearson's Magazine in 1903, he stated: "How the dickens can I patter and warble to that thing.  Can't a few of you come round and smile and clap a bit?"

In his music hall acts, Leno created characters based on observations mostly about life in London, including shopwalkers, grocer's assistants, beefeaters, huntsmen, racegoers, firemen, fathers, henpecked husbands, garrulous wives, pantomime dames, a police officer, a fireman and a hairdresser.  For his London acts, Leno purchased songs from the foremost music hall writers and composers, including Harry King, who wrote many of Leno's early successes, Harry Dacre and Joseph Tabrar. From 1890, George Le Brunn composed the music to many of Leno's songs and sketches, including "The Detective", "My Old Man", "Chimney on Fire", "The Fasting Man", "The Jap", "All Through a Little Piece of Bacon" and "The Detective Camera". Le Brunn also wrote the music for three of Leno's best known sketches that depicted life in everyday occupations: "The Railway Guard" (1890), "The Shopwalker" and The Waiter" (both from 1891). Leno made 14 short films towards the end of his life, most as himself, and four as an actor.  He generally portrayed a bumbling buffoon who struggles to carry out everyday tasks, such as riding a bicycle. In An Obstinate Cork (1902), one of Leno's few surviving films, he struggles to pull a cork out of a champagne bottle while on a picnic with his wife Lydia.

Discography 

 Note: Leno's recordings are listed in Gyles Brandreth's 1977 biography, The Funniest Man on Earth: The Story of Dan Leno.

Unrecorded songs, sketches and monologues

Notes and references

Notes

References

Sources

External links 

 
 Dan Leno profile and recordings of "The Huntsman" (1901) and "Going To The Races" (1903)
 The legacy of Dan Leno at Ward's Book of Days

Leno, Dan
Lists of musical works
Articles containing video clips